Richard Paul Leadbeater (born 21 October 1977) is an English retired footballer who played as a forward.

References

1977 births
Living people
English footballers
Sportspeople from Dudley
Association football forwards
Wolverhampton Wanderers F.C. players
Hereford United F.C. players
Stevenage F.C. players
Hednesford Town F.C. players
Nuneaton Borough F.C. players
English Football League players